Walter Luchetti (born 26 August 1937) is an Italian politician who served as the minister of agriculture between 1995 and 1996.

Biography
Luchetti was born in Marsciano, Perugia, on 26 August 1937. He was appointed the minister of agriculture in the cabinet led by Prime Minister Lamberto Dini in January 1995. Luchetti served in the post for one year until May 1996. In the period between 1996 and 2001 Luchetti served at the Italian Senate.

References

External links

20th-century Italian politicians
1937 births
Agriculture ministers of Italy
Living people
People from Perugia
Senators of Legislature XIII of Italy
Independent politicians in Italy